Mohamed Adam (born 5 August 2000) is a Sudanese-Australian professional footballer who plays as a forward.

Career

Western Sydney Wanderers
Adam was part of the 2017-18 Y-League championship winning Western Sydney Wanderers Youth team. He started and played 63 minutes as they beat Melbourne City Youth 3–1 in the 2018 Y-League Grand Final on 3 February 2018.

On 7 August 2019, Adam made his professional debut against Perth Glory in the 2019 FFA Cup, scoring the opening goal as the Wanderers won 2–1 in extra-time. He was subsequently awarded with a contract with the club on 9 August 2019, signing a two-year scholarship deal with the Wanderers.

On 23 September 2019, Adam was awarded the Wanderer's Youth Team Player of the Year having scored 21 goals in 21 games in their NPL NSW 2 campaign.

On December 28 2020, the club announced that Adam had departed from the club

Sydney Olympic

On January 21 2021, Sydney Olympic had announced that Adam had signed to the club.

Honours
Western Sydney Wanderers
Y-League: 2017–18

References

External links

2000 births
Living people
Australian soccer players
Association football forwards
Marconi Stallions FC players
Western Sydney Wanderers FC players
National Premier Leagues players
Australian people of Sudanese descent